Katsuhisa Nitta (born 25 April 1968) is a Japanese weightlifter. He competed in the men's bantamweight event at the 1992 Summer Olympics.

References

1968 births
Living people
Japanese male weightlifters
Olympic weightlifters of Japan
Weightlifters at the 1992 Summer Olympics
Sportspeople from Hiroshima